Altafjord is a fjord in Alta Municipality in Troms og Finnmark county, Norway. At Stjernøya and Seiland islands, the fjord splits into two straits before emptying into the Norwegian Sea. Some of the larger side-branches off the main fjord include Langfjorden, Kåfjorden, and Korsfjorden.

The fjord was historically known as "Altenfjord", and was referred to as such by British historians throughout most of the 20th century.

History

Prehistoric culture
A large number of prehistoric rock carvings have been found along the fjord, particularly at the bay Jiepmaluokta. These locations at Kåfjord, Jiepmaluokta, and Amtmannsnes are assigned a UNESCO World Heritage Site. The petroglyphs are dated from 4,200 BC to 500 BC, based on old shorelines and nearby prehistoric settlements.

World War II
During World War II there was a German naval base along the Kåfjorden, which branches off the main Altafjord. The German battleship Tirpitz was based at the village of Kåfjord (along the Kåfjorden). It was subject to attacks by British X class midget submarines in September 1943 (Operation Source), and in 1944 to air strikes in April (Operation Tungsten), July (Operation Mascot), August (Operation Goodwood), and September (Operation Paravane), after which Tirpitz was relocated to Tromsø, where a final bombing raid in November (Operation Catechism) sank the battleship.

References

Alta, Norway
Fjords of Troms og Finnmark